The El Patio Apartments is a historic site in Sarasota, Florida. It is located at 500 North Audubon Place. On May 6, 1993, it was added to the U.S. National Register of Historic Places.

Gallery

References

External links
 Sarasota County listings at National Register of Historic Places
 Sarasota County listings at Florida's Office of Cultural and Historical Programs

National Register of Historic Places in Sarasota County, Florida
Buildings and structures in Sarasota, Florida
Apartment buildings in Florida
Residential buildings on the National Register of Historic Places in Florida